Castenray is a village in the Dutch province of Limburg. It is a part of the municipality of Venray, and lies about 17 km northwest of Venlo.

The village was first mentioned in 1409 as Casterloe. The etymology is unclear. Castenray was home to 211 people in 1840.

Gallery

References

Populated places in Limburg (Netherlands)
Venray